Inju is a village in Vinni Parish, Lääne-Viru County, Estonia. It is 4 km south west of Pajusti and 12 km south of Rakvere.

Inju manor
The history of Inju manor goes back to at least 1520. In 1894 the current building was erected, probably designed by architect Rudolf von Engelhardt. It is one of the most characteristic examples of neo-Renaissance manor house architecture in Estonia.

See also
 List of palaces and manor houses in Estonia

References

External links
Inju manor at Estonian Manors Portal

Villages in Lääne-Viru County
Manor houses in Estonia
Kreis Wierland